The Moss family murders occurred on April 23, 1998, in Griswoldville, Georgia, United States. Three members of the Moss family, 11-year-old Bryan Moss, 15-year-old Kristin Moss, and their father 37-year-old Steven Moss, were shot to death by two burglars, 18-year-old Brandon Rhode and 19-year-old Daniel Lucas. Both men were given death sentences in 2000; Rhode was executed in 2010 and Lucas was executed in 2016, both via lethal injection.

Details

Moss family 
Steven Eugene Moss, of Swainsboro, Georgia, left his home state and moved to San Diego, California, where he married a woman named Gerri. They fathered their two children: Kristin Deann Moss in 1982, and Bryan James Moss in 1986. Afterward they moved back to Steven's native Georgia and settled near his family. Kristin was considered pretty, popular, smart, and athletic. She attended Jones County High School and played on their softball team. She was scheduled to graduate in 2001. Bryan attended Mattie Wells Elementary School and was in fifth grade. He was reported to have enjoyed football, baseball, and driving go-karts.

Murders 
On April 23, 1998, Gerri Moss, entered her home around 5:30 pm, and noticed her daughter, Kristin, sitting in the living room chair. Upon approaching, she noticed her husband, Steven, laying on the floor with a pillow over her head. Thinking it was a prank, she reportedly said "Okay guys, mommy's home. You can get up now". When she approached Kristin, she saw a bullet hole in her head. Afterward she frantically phoned her husband's uncle, Cary, who arrived at the home shortly after. Cary checked the pulses on Kristin and Steven and found both had been dead. He also found the body of the youngest family member, Bryan. Cary said that Bryan's face had "been beaten bad, with big bubbles coming out of his mouth". In the investigation afterward, a reward of $4,000 was announced to anyone who could give information leading to an arrest.

Legal proceedings 
On April 27, 1998, 18-year-old Brandon Joseph Rhode and 19-year-old Daniel Anthony Lucas were arrested in connection with the case. Items the two took from the Moss's home were found in their respective houses. Both were serial burglars who were found to have burglarized homes in Baldwin, Monroe, Twiggs, and Wilkinson counties, based on items found in their homes. All stolen items were returned to their respective homes. Rhode and Lucas admitted involvement in the Moss murders.

While being held in jail Rhode and another man, 27-year-old Roberto Gonzalez, escaped from the Jones County jail. They were recaptured 12 hours later a few miles from the jail. Lucas went to trial in September 1999 and was convicted. During the penalty phase of the trial, prosecutor Fred Bright exchanged with a defense witness that prisoners frequently escape state prisons. After Lucas was sentenced to death, his attorneys appealed in July 2001 claiming the exchange Bright had with the witness was "like dropping dynamite into the jury deliberations". Rhode was sentenced to death in 2000.

Executions 
On September 22, 2010, Rhode attempted suicide by slashing his wrists and throat with a razor blade but was saved by jail guards and recovered at the prison hospital; however, he was executed by lethal injection only six days later, which sparked controversy.

Lucas was executed on April 27, 2016.

See also 
 Freeman family murders
 List of people executed in Georgia (U.S. state)
 List of people executed in the United States in 2010
 List of people executed in the United States in 2016

References 

1998 deaths
1998 in Georgia (U.S. state)
1998 murders in the United States
Crimes in Georgia (U.S. state)
Deaths by person in Georgia (U.S. state)
Familicides
April 1998 crimes
April 1998 events in the United States
Murder committed by minors
Murder in Georgia (U.S. state)
Murdered American children
People murdered in Georgia (U.S. state)